The 1977 Brisbane Rugby League season was the 70th season of the Brisbane Rugby League premiership. Eight rugby league teams from across Brisbane competed for the premiership, which culminated in a grand final match between the  Eastern Suburbs and Redcliffe clubs.

Season summary 
Teams played each other three times, with 21 rounds of competition played. It resulted in a top four of Eastern Suburbs, Western Suburbs, Northern Suburbs and Redcliffe.

Teams

Ladder

Finals

Grand Final 

Eastern Suburbs 17 (Tries: John Callus, Steve Farquhar, Wayne Lindenburg. Goals: Greg Holben 4)

Redcliffe 13 (Tries: Forrester Grayson. Goals: Ian Pierce 5)

References

Rugby league in Brisbane
Brisbane Rugby League season